Dragonar Academy is a Japanese light novel series written by Shiki Mizuchi, illustrated by Kohada Shimesaba, and published by Media Factory under the MF Bunko J imprint. The first volume was released on June 25, 2010, with a total of 20 volumes available in Japan so far. A manga adaptation by the illustrator, Ran, began serialization in Monthly Comic Alive during its June 2011 issue. The manga is licensed in North America by Seven Seas Entertainment under the title Dragonar Academy.


Light novels

Manga

References

Dragonar Academy
Dragonar Academy